Shirthady (or Shirtady) is a village near Moodabidri town in Dakshina Kannada district.  It is surrounded by forest.  Kaadu or Kaadu means forest in Kannada, Pady or Padi means forest in Tulu language. This village has a school, Corporation Bank, Govt and private hospitals, a church and many temples and mosques. It is a junction for buses towards Perady, Marody, Naravi and Moodabidri.

External links 
  Shirtady

Villages in Dakshina Kannada district